Bistra is a commune in Maramureș County, Maramureș, Romania. The Ukrainian border is located to the north of the commune. It is made up of three villages: Bistra (commune seat), Crasna Vișeului and Valea Vișeului. The first documentary mention of the settlement dates to 1411.

Etymology and History 
The name Bistra comes from the Valea Bistrei river, with its spring in the Hodea (Hovdea) mountain peak.

The first documented mention of the village's population was in 1882, with 550 people living there. By 1896, the population had grown to 661, out of which 470 were Greek Catholic, 38 Roman Catholic and 153 Jews. In 1913, the village had a recorded population of 672, 511 being Ukrainians. The settlement continues to have a Ukrainian majority, the biggest demographic shift being the diminishing of the Jewish population.

The name Crasna Vișeului is believed to derive from the Ukrainian words for beautiful (krasnein, krasna, krasne), tied with the name of the river Crasna Frumuseaua. The river consists of two streams, one with its spring in Pop Ivan mountain Peak, and the other in Șerban-Topolev-Polonica peak. The two merge, forming a fast flowing clear river, hence the name, which eventually flows into the Vișeu river. The first mention of Crasna Vișeului village dates back to 1411 in the "Diploma of Robert, King of Hungary", which calls it the domain of the successors of Dragoș and Bogdan. According to documents of the time, the village bore the name of Frumosava in 1882. Between the XIV and XIX centuries the settlement belonged to the nearby village of Petrova. Between 1945 and 1968 the village was autonomous, but ever since 1968, Crasna Vișeului has been part of Bistra commune.

As a settlement, Valea Vișeului's existence has been documented since the beginning of the XV century. Its name derives from the Vișeu river and the word Valea (Valley in Romanian, Долина (r. Dolyna) in Ukrainian). Throughout its history, the village went through numerous name changes: Viso-Vișeu, Visovelidi, Valea-Vișeului, Fehei Potoc. Despite the lack of clear information, it is believed the original settlers in this area of the Tisza river bank were Hutsuls.

Early in their history, all three villages were assigned under Petrova, as the locals were likely the slaves (robi) of Petrovan nobles.

Between 1985 and 1989, a group of archeologists uncovered, in a place called Uloha, objects made of bronze that date back to the XI century. These objects are now in the custody of the Sighetu Marmației Museum of History and are the oldest records of human settlement in the area.

Geography 
The commune has an area of 132.39 km2(15.12 sq mi) and is mostly mountainous and forested. It is bordered by Ukraine to the north, Repedea commune to the east, Ruscova commune to the south-east, Petrova commune to the south-west and Rona de Sus commune to the west.

Villages

Bistra 
Despite having the smallest population of the three, Bistra village is the commune's administrative center. It is home to the commune's town hall and police department, and the Bistra I-VIII Grade School. The County Road DJ185 runs through the settlement, on the western part, near the bank of the Vișeu river.

Crasna Vișeului 
Often shortened to Crasna, Crasna Vișeului village is located close to the bank of the Vișeu river, near the neighboring commune of Petrova. Because of its proximity to ethnically Romanian villages such as Petrova, the settlement is a mixed community, ethnically and linguistically. Young people are more likely to be bilingual.

Valea Vișeului 
Valea Vișeului village is located in the north part of the commune. The Ukraine border with Romania is located north of the village. In the north-west of the village the river Vișeu joins the Tisza. The Vișeu also separates the village into two important areas: the main part of the village - on the right bank of the Vișeu - and Zaveschiva - on the left bank of the river.

Maramureș Mountains Natural Park 
A majority of the commune's territory falls under the Maramureș Mountains Natural Park, the largest Natural Park in Romania. On the territory of Bistra commune, there are landmarks such as Polonica (Polonika) Peak and Bendivskei Cave.

Economy 

The main activity of the residents is subsistence farming, the main crops being potatoes, corn, oat, beans, onions, carrots, parsley, garlic and cucumbers. Woodcutting and woodworking have also been important activities for the locals throughout history, with the activity expanding in scale in recent years. A large part of the population also works in the public sector, in education, health, administration, telecommunications and rail.

Valea Vișeului railway station is an important railway station in Maramureș County, the village having direct links with some of the main cities of Romania, like Bucharest, Timișoara, Cluj-Napoca or Mangalia (only in summer). A railway line connecting with Rakhiv in Ukraine closed in 2011, but, following the 2022 Russian invasion of Ukraine, which hindered the country's ability to export by sea, CFR began work on restoring the railway line, reopening it in October 2022.

Demographics
The population is divided by village as follows:
1017 in Bistra
1491 in Valea Vișeului
1666 in Crasna Vișeului

Ethnicity

According to the 2011 census, the commune has a population of 4,174 inhabitants, of which 89% are Ukrainians and 10.5% Romanians. Because Ukrainians make up the majority of the population, the Ukrainian language is used beside Romanian, with signage, education, access to justice and public services being provided in both languages.

Religion

The Majority of the population is Orthodox Christian, and has been since the arrival of the first settlers, as outlined by Alexandru Filipașcu in 'The History of Maramureș'.

The first wooden church built in Bistra dates back to 1856. Between 1960 and 1965 it was renovated and modified, and in 1992, it was destroyed following a fire. The first church in Valea Vișeului was built in 1880, and the first in Crasna Vișeului in 1882. The commune's 3 churches are headed by Priests Săcăluș (Valea-Vișeului), Ardelean Ion (Bistra) and Ardelean Vasile (Crasna Vișeului).

Administration and politics

Current 
Vasile Duciuc of the National Liberal Party was re-elected as mayor of Bistra commune for a third term in the 2020 Romanian local elections.

Historical 
Bistra became a commune in 1913.

List of mayors:

 Dutciuc Feodor
 Mascaliuc Mihai
 Ciubica Dumitru
 Marchis Mihai
 Cocerjuc Nicolae
 Anisorae Vasile
 Maricee Petru
 Roman Stefania
 Coreniue Dumitru
 Onujec Vasile

Crasna Vișeului was autonomous between 1945 and 1968, then incorporated into Bistra commune.

List of mayors:

 Baraniuc Ivan
 Romaniuc Nicolae
 Bilcee Nicolae

 Gredjuc Dumitru

Valea Vișeului was historically either administered by Rona de Sus or autonomous.

List of mayors:

 Stefan Soriceae (1918)
 Nicolae Frasin (1926-1940)
 Petrut Iurcut (1940-1944)
 Petru Papariga (1944-1950)

Natives

Bistra
Vasile Marchiș, football player
Valea Vișeului
Havrelo Clempuș, writer
Vasile Luțac, musician and teacher

Image gallery

References

External links

Communes in Maramureș County
Localities in Romanian Maramureș
Place names of Slavic origin in Romania
Ukrainian communities in Romania